Coveyville is an unincorporated community in Marshall Township, Lawrence County, Indiana. It was originally named Goat's Run.

Geography

References

Unincorporated communities in Lawrence County, Indiana
Unincorporated communities in Indiana